Luisa Gomes Maia (born 10 October, 2006) is a Brazilian artistic gymnast and a member of the Brazilian national gymnastics team. She is part of the team that got the unprecedented bronze medal for Brazil, at the DTB Pokal Mixed Cup, surpassing the United States team.

Career

2022
At the Gymnasiade, Luisa Maia, alongside Júlia Soares, Rafaela Oliva, Camille Fonseca and Marcela Meirelles reached the fourth position at the team final. Maia finished at eighth and sixth in the all-around and uneven bars finals, respectively.

In August, during the Brazilian Championships, Maia debuted in her new club, Flamengo, helping her new teammates Rebeca Andrade, Flávia Saraiva, Lorrane Oliveira, Hellen Carvalho and Larissa Oliveira dominate the field by more than 22 points. Later that month, Luisa Maia got team and all-around gold at the South American Championships and sixth in the beam final.

On her last competition of the year, Luisa Maia got team gold with the contributions of Júlia Soares, Carolyne Pedro, Christal Bezerra, Thaís Fidélis and Beatriz Lima at the 2022 South American Games. She also finished fourth in the all-around and seventh in the balance beam final.

2023
Luisa Maia began her year of competitions at the DTB Pokal Team Challenge and Mixed Cup. After a competitive field in the Team Challenge, the Brazilian team composed of Júlia Soares, Carolyne Pedro, Gabriela Barbosa and Josiany Calixto finished ninth. One day later, Maia, Pedro and Calixto, alongside Tomás Florêncio, Yuri Guimarães and Josué Heliodoro got the unprecedented bronze medal for Brazil, surpassing the United States team by 0.166 points.

Competitive history

References

External links

Living people
Brazilian gymnasts
Women's gymnastics
2006 births